The 2022 French presidential election was held on 10 and 24 April 2022. As no candidate won a majority in the first round, a runoff was held, in which Emmanuel Macron defeated Marine Le Pen and was re-elected as President of France. Macron, from La République En Marche! (LREM), had defeated Le Pen, leader of the National Rally, once already in the 2017 French presidential election, for the term which expired on 13 May 2022. Macron became the first President of France to win a re-election bid since Jacques Chirac won in 2002.

In the first round, Macron took the lead with 27.9% of votes, followed by Le Pen with 23.2%, Jean-Luc Mélenchon of La France Insoumise with 22%, and Éric Zemmour of Reconquête with 7.1%. Valérie Pécresse of The Republicans took 4.8% of the vote, and Anne Hidalgo, mayor of Paris and Socialist Party candidate, 1.8%. Both the Republicans and Socialist parties, considered to be the dominant parties until 2017, received their worst results in a presidential election.

In the second round, Macron beat Le Pen with 58.5% of the vote to her 41.5%, a narrower margin than in the 2017 election. Turnout was 72.0%, the lowest in a presidential election run-off since 1969. Le Pen conceded defeat after exit projections became available. The presidential election was followed by the 2022 French legislative election, held on 12–19 June, to elect the 577 members of the National Assembly, the lower house of the French Parliament.

Electoral system

Under Article 7 of the Constitution of France, the president is elected to a five-year term in a two-round election. If no candidate secures an absolute majority of votes in the first round, a second round is held two weeks later between the two candidates who received the most votes. According to the Constitution of France, the first round of the presidential election must be held between 20 and 35 days before the transition of power at the end of the five-year term of the incumbent officeholder. As Emmanuel Macron took office on 14 May 2017, the transition of power is expected to take place on 13 May 2022. Correspondingly, the first round of the presidential election was to be held between 8 and 23 April 2022, with the second round held two weeks after the first. On 13 July 2021, Government Spokesman Gabriel Attal announced the dates for the election, respectively 10 April 2022 for the first round and 24 April 2022 for the eventual second round.

To be listed on the first-round ballot, candidates needed to secure 500 signatures (often referred to as parrainages in French) from national or local elected officials from at least 30 different departments or overseas collectivities, with no more than a tenth of these signatories from any single department.  The signatures were submitted to the Constitutional Council, which is the sole authority to designate participants.

First round

Campaign
Following the 2017 presidential election, The Republicans (LR) sent its members a questionnaire on the topic of the "re-foundation" of the party; of the 40,000 respondents, 70% voted against an open primary like that which was held in 2016 to determine the party nominee. In a document dated 17 October 2017, the Socialist Party (PS) wrote that the financing of the 2022 presidential campaign was not assured despite "economic restructuring" but still planned to spend €12,000,000, the maximum legally permitted before the first round. According to the report, the party's leadership had seriously considered the possibility of not presenting a PS candidate in 2022.

Marine Le Pen, the president of the National Rally (RN), announced on 16 January 2020 that she would be running in the election. She previously ran in the 2012 and 2017 presidential elections as the party's candidate, then called the National Front (FN). She came third in 2012 with 17.9% of the vote in the first round and second in 2017 with 21.3% of the vote in the first round and 33.9% of the vote in the second round. Le Pen was elected to the National Assembly in the 2017 French legislative election.

Jean Lassalle, who ran in the 2017 presidential election under the Résistons! banner, coming in seventh place with 1.2% of the vote, announced that he would run again. In 2020, MP Joachim Son-Forget, a radiologist who was elected to the National Assembly for La République En Marche! (LREM) in 2017, formed a new political party called Valeur Absolue and announced his intention to enter the race for the presidency. He had resigned from the LREM group after posting tweets in 2018 that were deemed sexist; he then joined the UDI and Independents group in 2019 before resigning his membership later that year.

On 8 November 2020, Jean-Luc Mélenchon, founder of La France Insoumise (LFI), announced that he would be running in the election. He previously ran in the 2012 presidential election for the Left Front (coming fourth with 11.1% of the vote in the first round) and in the 2017 presidential election for LFI (coming fourth again with 19.5% of the vote in the first round). Mélenchon was elected to the National Assembly in 2017.

In November 2021, Ensemble Citoyens was founded. It is a political coalition composed of the presidential majority led under Emmanuel Macron.

In January 2022, Éric Zemmour's party Reconquête, which was founded the month prior, gained a member of the National Assembly in Guillaume Peltier, previously elected as a member of LR, as well as two Members of the European Parliament (MEPs) when Jérôme Rivière and Gilbert Collard defected from Le Pen's RN. Previously, Son-Forget, who had declared he would run for the presidency, rallied behind Zemmour's candidacy. In early February 2022, the party gained a third MEP when Maxette Grisoni-Pirbakas defected from the RN. Stéphane Ravier became Zemmour's first supporter in the Senate after he left the RN mid-February 2022.

In February 2022, a wave of defections hit Valérie Pécresse, candidate put forward by LR, in favour of Macron. She was accused by members of the party's centrist wing of trying to pander to the voters of Zemmour, whose sharp rise in the polls has been qualified as "meteoric". During a rally in February 2022, Pécresse said "in ten years time ... will we be a sovereign nation, a US satellite or a Chinese trading post? Will we be unified or divided? Nothing is written, whether it is loss of economic status, or the Great Replacement." She was criticised for referring to the Great Replacement; she later said that her mention was not an endorsement of what she considered to be a "theory of hate".

The 2022 Russian invasion of Ukraine that began on 24 February had significant implications for the campaign. As media coverage switched to covering the war, Macron's polling improved significantly during the crisis. Le Pen and Zemmour were made to explain historic statements of praise for Vladimir Putin. In a 14 March 2022 interview with newspaper Le Figaro, Gérard Larcher, Senate President and a supporter of Pécresse, put into question the legitimacy of a possible second Macron term, stating: "If there is no campaign, the question of the legitimacy of the winner will arise." Those comments echoed Macron's refusal to participate in any debate with the other candidates prior to the election's first round.

Macron formally announced his candidacy for re-election on 3 March 2022, by which time he had already received well more than the sponsorships from elected officials to qualify for the ballot.

Marion Maréchal of the Le Pen family, granddaughter of FN founder Jean-Marie Le Pen and niece of its current leader Marine Le Pen, formalised her support for Zemmour at a large rally in Toulon on 6 March 2022. In the final days before the first round of voting, Le Pen's polling numbers improved to within the margin of error of defeating Macron in the second round, while those of Pécresse and Zemmour fell.

Mélenchon's polling numbers also surged in the final days of campaigning. Left-leaning independent candidate Christiane Taubira, former Minister of Justice (2012–2014) under President François Hollande and winner of the 2022 People's Primary vote, withdrew her candidacy on 2 March 2022, endorsing Mélenchon.

Primaries and congresses

Ecologist primary

In September 2021, the Ecology Pole organised a presidential primary to determine their candidate. The following candidates participated in this primary:

Nominee
Yannick Jadot, Member of the European Parliament since 2009

 Sandrine Rousseau, deputy national secretary of Europe Ecology – The Greens from 2016 to 2017
 Delphine Batho, president of Ecology Generation and deputy for the 2nd constituency of Deux-Sèvres since 2013
 Éric Piolle, Mayor of Grenoble since 2014
 Jean-Marc Governatori, co-president of Cap Écologie and city councillor for Nice since 2020.

Socialist primary
In October 2021, the Socialist Party had its primary. Mayor of Paris Anne Hidalgo won with 72% of the vote.
Nominee
Anne Hidalgo, Mayor of Paris since 2014

Stéphane Le Foll, Mayor of Le Mans since 2018

People's Primary

Independent activists launched a primary with the intention of nominating a unity left-wing candidate. The voting took place online from 27 to 30 January 2022. Of the seven candidates listed in the primary, three declined to participate. The primary was conducted according to a majority judgment voting system, in which all voters are to rate all candidates, with the candidate with the highest median rating winning. 
Nominee
 Christiane Taubira, Minister of Justice 2012–2016 (withdrew, endorsed Mélenchon)

 Anna Agueb-Porterie, environmental activist
 Anne Hidalgo, Mayor of Paris since 2014, Socialist Party candidate (still a candidate)
 Yannick Jadot, Member of the European Parliament since 2009, Green Party candidate (still a candidate)
 Pierre Larrouturou, Member of the European Parliament since 2019
 Charlotte Marchandise, public health expert
 Jean-Luc Mélenchon, Member of the National Assembly, La France Insoumise candidate (still a candidate)

The Republicans congress

The Republicans selected their candidate via a congress of party members. On 4 December 2021, Valérie Pécresse won the nomination with 60.95% of the votes against Éric Ciotti.
Nominee
 Valérie Pécresse, President of the Regional Council of Île-de-France since 2016

 Éric Ciotti, deputy for the 1st constituency of Alpes-Maritimes since 2007
 Michel Barnier, head of the Task Force for Relations with the United Kingdom from 2019 to 2021
 Xavier Bertrand, President of the Regional Council of Hauts-de-France since 2016
 Philippe Juvin, Mayor of La Garenne-Colombes since 2001

Candidates
On 7 March 2022, the Constitutional Council published names of the 12 candidates who received 500 valid sponsorships, with the order determined by drawing lots.

Sponsorships
A candidate must have secured 500 Présentation signatures from elected officials in order to appear on the first-round ballot. The signature collection period ended on 4 March. The table below lists sponsorships received by the Constitutional Council by candidate. On the form, this is named a présentation but is more widely known as parrainage. There were 46 individuals who received at least 1 sponsorship as of the closing date deadline of 4 March 2022. Some of them received sponsorships without being candidates, and one sponsored himself. Candidates labeled SE (sans etiquette) do not belong to any political party.
Colour legend

Second round

Endorsements
Arthaud and Lassalle both said they would vote blank, with Lassalle saying he trusts the French people to do what is right. Mélenchon, Poutou, and Roussel stated their opposition to Le Pen but did not endorse Macron.

Campaign
On 14 April 2022, Le Pen said if elected she would hold a referendum on whether to reinstate capital punishment in France, if such a proposal garnered enough signatures under the  citizens' initiative referendum system she wants to implement. Le Pen had also campaigned for a ban on wearing Muslim headscarves in public.

On 20 April, the only election debate of the campaign (moderated by Léa Salamé and Gilles Bouleau) to feature both major candidates was held. Polls conducted after the debate to ascertain which candidate performed best, showed that 59% of viewers thought that Macron had performed better, compared to 39% for Le Pen.

Candidates

Opinion polls

The trendlines below are constructed using local regressions.

First round

Second round

Results 
Macron was re-elected with 58.55% of the vote to 41.45% for Le Pen in the second round of the election. Exit poll projections by Ipsos and Sopra Steria for France Télévisions and Radio France, released as voting closed, estimated that Macron defeated Le Pen with 58.2% of the vote to 41.8%. He became the first French president to win re-election since Jacques Chirac in 2002. The projections, based on actual ballot papers, also showed that 28% of registered voters did not show up to the second round, making it the lowest turnout since 1969. Official results showed that the turnout was 71.99%, with over 13 million abstentions in the second round, in addition to over 8.6% of ballots cast being blank or invalid (a marked increase over the first round).

|- style="background-color:#E9E9E9;text-align:center;"
! colspan="2" rowspan="2"| Candidate
! rowspan="2" colspan="2"| Party
! colspan="2"| 1st round  10 April 2022
! colspan="2"| 2nd round  24 April 2022
|-
! width="75"|Votes
! width="30"|%
! width="75"|Votes
! width="30"|%
|-
| style="background-color:;"|
| style="text-align:left;"| Emmanuel Macron
| style="text-align:left;"| La République En Marche!
| LREM
| 9,783,058
| 27.85
| 18,768,639
| 58.55
|-
| style="background-color:;"|
| style="text-align:left;"| Marine Le Pen
| style="text-align:left;"| National Rally
| RN
| 8,133,828
| 23.15
| 13,288,686
| 41.45
|-
| style="background-color:;"|
| style="text-align:left;"| Jean-Luc Mélenchon
| style="text-align:left;"| La France Insoumise
| LFI
| 7,712,520
| 21.95
|style="background-color:#F4F4F4;" colspan="2" rowspan="10"|
|-
| style="background-color:;"|
| style="text-align:left;"| Éric Zemmour
| style="text-align:left;"| Reconquête
| R!
| 2,485,226
| 7.07
|-
| style="background-color:;"|
| style="text-align:left;"| Valérie Pécresse
| style="text-align:left;"| The Republicans
| LR
| 1,679,001
| 4.78 
|-
| style="background-color:;"|
| style="text-align:left;"| Yannick Jadot
| style="text-align:left;"| Europe Ecology – The Greens
| EELV
| 1,627,853
| 4.63
|-
| style="background-color:;"|
| style="text-align:left;"| Jean Lassalle
| style="text-align:left;" | Résistons!
| RES
| 1,101,387
| 3.13
|-
| style="background-color:;"|
| style="text-align:left;"| Fabien Roussel
| style="text-align:left;"| French Communist Party
| PCF
| 802,422
| 2.28
|-
| style="background-color:;"|
| style="text-align:left;"| Nicolas Dupont-Aignan
| style="text-align:left;"| Debout la France
| DLF
| 725,176
| 2.06

|-
| style="background-color:;"|
| style="text-align:left;"| Anne Hidalgo
| style="text-align:left;"| Socialist Party
| PS
| 616,478
| 1.75
|-
| style="background-color:;"|
| style="text-align:left;"| Philippe Poutou
| style="text-align:left;"| New Anticapitalist Party
| NPA
| 268,904
| 0.77
|-
| style="background-color:;"|
| style="text-align:left;"| Nathalie Arthaud
| style="text-align:left;"| Lutte Ouvrière
| LO
| 197,094
| 0.56
|-
| style="background-color:#E9E9E9;" colspan="10"|
|- style="font-weight:bold"
| style="text-align:left;" colspan="4"| Total
| 35,132,947
| 100.00
| 32,057,325
| 100.00
|-
| style="background-color:#E9E9E9;" colspan="10"|
|-
| style="text-align:left;" colspan="4"| Valid votes
| 35,132,947
| 97.80
| 32,057,325
| 91.34
|-
| style="text-align:left;" colspan="4"| Blank ballots
| 543,609
| 1.51
| 2,233,904
| 6.37
|-
| style="text-align:left;" colspan="4"| Invalid ballots
| 247,151
| 0.69
| 805,249
| 2.29
|-
| style="text-align:left;" colspan="4"| Turnout
| 35,923,707
| 73.69
| 35,096,478
| 71.99
|-
| style="text-align:left;" colspan="4"| Not voted
| 12,824,169
| 26.31
| 13,655,861
| 28.01
|-
| style="text-align:left;" colspan="4"| Registered voters
| 48,747,876
| style="background-color:#F4F4F4;"|
| 48,752,339
| style="background-color:#F4F4F4;"|
|-
| style="background-color:#F4F4F4;" colspan="10"|
|-
| style="text-align:left" colspan="10"| Source: Minister of the Interior
|}

First round

Tables

Maps

Second round

Tables

Maps

Aftermath 
The New York Times commented that the race was much closer than in 2017, when Macron won 66.1% of the vote to Le Pen's 33.9%, but that Macron's margin was wider than expected prior to the election. Le Pen conceded defeat minutes after the estimated results were released, but still called the outcome a victory for her political movement and for the upcoming parliamentary elections. It was the best result for the far right in France since the founding of the Fifth French Republic in 1958.

Olivier Véran, Minister for Solidarity and Health, stated that the government has "heard the French people's message", referring to the increasing number of votes for the far-right, and that "there will be a change of method". Macron reflected on the results of the elections self-critically, assuming that many voters voted for him to counter the far right rather than in support of his political positions. Macron was congratulated by several world leaders on his re-election, with his first call coming from German chancellor Olaf Scholz.

Notes

Footnotes

References

External links

Constitutional Council official site (in French)

 
Presidential
April 2022 events in France
2022